Erica Peck is a Canadian stage actress, who made her breakthrough in the 2007 Toronto Mirvish production of We Will Rock You and the 2013 US and Canadian national tour. She is currently in the Toronto production of Kinky Boots.

Born in London, Ontario and raised in the Port Credit area of Mississauga while attending Cawthra Park Secondary School. She left Sheridan College's musical theatre program before graduating, to join the cast of We Will Rock You. While still active on stage, she owns and operates an Etsy-based online vintage shop called WILDTHINGVINTAGE.
Erica is now playing the role of Magenta in Rocky Horror picture show at the Avon theatre in Stratford On

References

External links
 Erica Peck profile on The Talent House agency
 Wildthingvintage on Etsy
 Erica Peck on BroadwayWorld.com

Actresses from London, Ontario
Canadian stage actresses
Living people
Year of birth missing (living people)